Westminster Christian Academy (WCA) is a K–12, private, college preparatory Christian school. Its campus is located at 1640 New High Shoals Road in Watkinsville, Oconee County, Georgia, United States.

History 

Westminster Christian Academy was founded in the fall of 1989.  The school's initial class was composed of 10 first, second, and third grade students meeting in rented space at Faith Presbyterian Church in Watkinsville, taught by Karen Schaefer. The school grew alongside the oldest students in this first class, adding a new grade level after each school year.

In 1994, enrollment in the school outgrew the capacity of its facilities at Faith Presbyterian. As a result, the school's lower grades (K-4) remained at Faith, and the higher grades (5-8, the highest grade offered at the time) moved to facilities at Watkinsville First Baptist Church. WCA's first high school class graduated in the spring of 1999.

The school completed the first phase of development at its present location, a  site in Oconee County, in the fall of 1998. An additional expansion was planned that would add a new gymnasium and bring the school's capacity to 500 students. In 2018, another expansion was and is still planned to make new 6-12th grade classrooms that make the capacity of the school to 750.

Academics 
The school enrolled 368 students across all grades for the 2021–2022 academic year.

WCA's facilities include an administration building, which also houses the Tech Lab, the art room, and the music room. WCA's campus also contain a lower-school building, which houses Pre-K through fifth grade WCA also has an upper-school building with a gymnasium and a weight room, which houses the Middle School and the High School. The gymnasium also known as the "upper-school" houses ten classrooms. The campus has a field house containing two class rooms and an office. The field house also contains a basement dedicated to the Boy Scouts. The campus also includes three athletic fields. 

Uniforms are required on four out of five days for middle through high school; on "casual Friday,"  students can wear non-khaki, but still modest pants and T-shirts. A chapel is held every Friday at separate times for K-5 and 6-12 where all students sing and listen to a guest speaker.

WCA is accredited by the Georgia Accrediting Commission and has a dual accreditation with the Southern Association of Independent Schools and the Southern Association of Colleges and Schools.

Athletics 
WCA's athletics teams compete in Region 1-A of the Georgia Association of Private and Parochial Schools(GAPPS). The school sponsors teams in the following sports:

 Baseball - boys'
 Basketball - boys' and girls'
 Cheerleading - girls'
 Cross country - boys' and girls' 
 Soccer - boys' and girls'
 Swimming - boys' and girls'
 Volleyball - girls'
 Tennis - boys' and girls'
 Golf - 
 Football - boys'

The school claims that nearly 80% of the student body participates in an officially sanctioned sport.
The school previously had a football team, but cut it because of budget. WCA brought back football to the school during the 2022-2023 school year.

Academic Student Activities 

 National Honor Society (10th-12th)
 Mock Trial (9th-12th)
 Lions Lead (Lions lead is a replacement for the traditional student government) (9th-12th)
 One-Act (9th-12th)
 Y-Club (8th-12th)
 Literary (7th-12th)
 Chapel Band (6th-12th)
 Geography Bee (6th-8th)
 Spelling Bee (1st-8th)
 Quiz Bowl (6th-12th)
 Math Bowl
 History bowl 
 4-H Club (5th grade only)
 Middle school robotics club (6th-8th)

References 

Christian schools in Georgia (U.S. state)
Private high schools in Georgia (U.S. state)
Educational institutions established in 1989
Schools in Oconee County, Georgia
Private middle schools in Georgia (U.S. state)
Private elementary schools in Georgia (U.S. state)
Preparatory schools in Georgia (U.S. state)
1989 establishments in Georgia (U.S. state)